Torrazzo is a comune (municipality) in the Province of Biella in the Italian region Piedmont, located about  northeast of Turin and about  southwest of Biella.

Torrazzo borders the following municipalities: Bollengo, Burolo, Chiaverano, Magnano, Sala Biellese, Zubiena.

References

Cities and towns in Piedmont